Proeulia nubleana is a species of moth of the family Tortricidae. It is found in Chile (Maule Region, Nuble Province).

References

Moths described in 2003
Endemic fauna of Chile
Proeulia
Moths of South America
Taxa named by Józef Razowski